Saints of Virtue is a 3D medieval first-person shooter video game developed by Shine Studios and published by Cactus Game Design. Released in 1999, it was one of the first Christian first person shooter games, and led to the release of other medieval/ancient FPS games of the same style.

Plot 
The game takes place in a world allegorical to the spiritual aspects of the human heart. The player represents a Christian who enters his own heart to do battle with spiritual forces of temptation and to become a true 'Saint of Virtue.'

Gameplay 
The game features four levels, each representing a spiritual obstacle to the player's journey towards becoming a 'Saint of Virtue'. Enemies – floating masks representative of negative moral choices – appear frequently in the game, and must be destroyed using the Sword of the Spirit, which fires blue bolts. Players can pick up power-ups like the Shield of Faith, which reduces the damage taken by enemies, and "Spiritual health", which boosts the player's health bar.

Discontinuation 
After an extended period of time supporting the game, Shine Studios decided to discontinue the game in 2014 at the same time that the website (http://www.saintsofvirtue.com/) was set to expire. The game is no longer available for purchase digitally, and finding a CD version of the game is becoming increasingly difficult.

References 

First-person shooters
1999 video games
Windows games
Windows-only games
Christian video games
Video games developed in the United States
Sprite-based first-person shooters
3D GameStudio games
Single-player video games

External links
SaintsX - A Windows 64-bit patch and runtime environment